Lallu Singh (born 1 November 1954) is a member of the Bharatiya Janata Party and has won the 2014 Indian general elections and again in 2019 Lok sabha election from the Faizabad (Lok Sabha constituency).

Early life and education

Lallu Singh was born on 1 November 1954 to Shri Bhagwan Singh and Smt. Sunderadevi. He was born in a village named Raipur near Faizabad city, which is located in Faizabad district in Uttar Pradesh.

Political career

1991 – 2012: Member, Uttar Pradesh Legislative Assembly (Five terms 1991,1993, 1996, 2002,2007) From Ayodhya Vidhan Sabha
May, 2014: Elected to 16th Lok Sabha He also won the election on 23 May 2019 and became member of parliament.

References

Living people
India MPs 2014–2019
People from Faizabad district
Lok Sabha members from Uttar Pradesh
Place of birth missing (living people)
Bharatiya Janata Party politicians from Uttar Pradesh
1954 births
India MPs 2019–present